Nada Mohamed Abdulzaher Mohamed Al-Bedwawi (born August 15, 1997) is an Emirati swimmer. She competed at the 2016 Summer Olympics in the women's 50 metre freestyle event; her time of 33.42 seconds in the heats did not qualify her for the semifinals. She was the first female Olympic swimmer from the United Arab Emirates and was the country's flag bearer at the Parade of Nations.

References

1997 births
Living people
Emirati female swimmers
Olympic swimmers of the United Arab Emirates
Swimmers at the 2016 Summer Olympics